Gothards Vilhelms Nikolajs Munters (25 July 1898 in Riga – 11 January 1967, Riga) was a Latvian diplomat who served as Minister of Foreign Affairs of the Republic of Latvia from 1936 to 1940. He was also a member of the Council of the League of Nations from 1936 to 1938, Chairman of the Far East Commission and the President of the 101st Session of the League in 1938.

Munters was the signatory on behalf of the Latvian government in a number of important international agreements with the Baltic states, Nazi Germany and the Soviet Union from 1934 to 1939.

Biography

Early life 
Vilhelms Munters was born on July 25, 1898 in Riga to Estonian trader Nikolai Munter (Nikolajs Munters, died 1930) and Baltic German mother from Estonia, Auguste Klein (Kleina). She and Vilhelm's sister later repatriated to Germany in 1939. He graduated with a gold medal from Riga Stock Exchange Business School in 1915 and enrolled in the Faculty of Chemistry of the Riga Polytechnic Institute. That same year he, together with the institute, evacuated to Moscow due to World War I and continued his studies until 1917. On May 22, 1917, Munters was drafted into the Imperial Russian Army, where he served in the 1st Preparatory Training Battalion in Nizhny Novgorod and from August 8 to October 26 studied at the Vladimir Military School in Saint Petersburg. He, together with other cadets, took part in fighting during the Bolshevik October Revolution and was shortly imprisoned in the Peter and Paul Fortress, but released thanks to an acquaintance. Afterwards he worked as an oiler in the Treugolnik factory.

After the signing of the Treaty of Brest-Litovsk, Munters returned to German-occupied Riga in July 1918. During the Latvian War of Independence he was drafted by the Army of the Latvian Socialist Soviet Republic in March 1919, only to soon desert. After the Battle of Cēsis he joined the 6th Infantry Regiment, 1st Division of the Estonian Army on June 24, 1919. Munters fought in North Vidzeme, served as the Estonian Army Command team leader and the aide-de-camp of the Viljandi Garrison of the 6th Infantry Regiment until October 17, 1920, when he was retired from active service with the rank of lieutenant.

On November 22, 1920, he was drafted into the Latvian Armed Forces and assigned to the 6th Riga Infantry Regiment, but was discharged with the rank of virsseržants (staff sergeant) on December 20. While working for the Ministry of Foreign Affairs of Latvia, Munters resumed his studies at the Faculty of Chemistry of the University of Latvia and graduated in 1925 with a degree in engineering chemistry (ing. chem.).

In 1934, he married Natālija Sūna (née Kļagina, 1897–1973 in Riga). They had one son, Andrejs (born 1935), and an adopted daughter, Margarita (born 1934), both of which died in a children's home in the Uzbek SSR in 1942 during the family's deportation. Natālija also had a son from a previous marriage, Nikolajs Sūna (born 1921).

Diplomatic service career 

Since December 20, 1920, Munters began working at the Ministry of Foreign Affairs of Latvia. Until October 1921 he was the 3rd Secretary of the Information Section of the Political-Economic Department, reaching the post of 1st Secretary in August 1922. In April 1923 he was transferred to the Western Section, in April 1924 – the Press Section, and in February 1925 he took charge of the Baltic States Section. Two years later he was appointed as a representative of the ministry to the External Trade Commission of the Ministry of Finance, and in January 1931 Munters became the director of the Administrative-Legal Department and the Assistant General Secretary of the ministry. His salary in 1927 was 3600 Ls per year, and he lived in a three-room apartment in Stabu iela 62.

In addition to his posts, Munters was a member of various high-rank committees in the ministry and took part in drafting important economic and political agreements with foreign nations. Since 1931, he participated in all plenary meetings of the League of Nations.

On 14 July 1933, Munters was appointed General Secretary of the Ministry of Foreign Affairs with vice-ministerial functions. After the 1934 Latvian coup d'état led by Kārlis Ulmanis, despite Ulmanis taking up the post of Minister of Foreign Affairs on July 17, Munters became the de facto head of the ministry. From 1935 to 1939 he led the Latvian delegation at the League of Nations, being the main representative from 1936 to 1938. There, in 1937 on the 13th Plenary Session he was elected Head of the Far East Commission, but in 1938 - as the President of the 101st Session.

Vilhelms Munters became the Minister of Foreign Affairs of the Republic of Latvia on 14 July 1936, and served in this capacity until 21 June 1940. On 7 June 1939, Munters signed the German-Latvian Non-Aggression Pact in Berlin and on 5 October 1939 - the Soviet–Latvian Mutual Assistance Treaty (commonly known in Latvia as the "(Military) Base Treaty"), which the USSR later used as the basis of the Soviet occupation of Latvia in 1940.

Deportation and imprisonment 
After the Soviet occupation of Latvia, he was de facto replaced by Augusts Kirhenšteins, and the Munters family was deported on 16 July 1940 in the presence of the collaborationist Minister of the Interior Vilis Lācis. During forced exile in Voronezh, he worked in the Institute of Foreign Language Teachers. In the meantime, Munters wrote multiple requests to Soviet People's Commissar for Internal Affairs Lavrentiy Beria, sharing detailed information on many contemporaries.

On 26 June 1941 Munters was arrested. First imprisoned in Voronezh, he was transferred to Saratov in September and a year later - to Kirov Prison. There, on 14 April 1952, the Special Council of the NKVD sentenced Munters to 25 years in prison for "active struggle against the revolutionary workers' movement and hostile actions against the USSR" and imprisoned him in Moscow's Butyrka prison and Vladimir Central Prison. After the death of Joseph Stalin, he was released on 19 August 1954, but was forbidden to return to the Baltic states.

Final years and death 
After release, Munters and his family lived in Vladimir-on-Klyazma, with him working as a translator in the Vladimir Tractor Factory. In 1958 he together with his family was finally permitted to return to occupied Latvia, where in 1959 he started to work as a translator in the editorial board of the official newsletter of the Latvian SSR Academy of Sciences, with contributions to other scientific publications.

Since 1962, Munters penned articles in Izvestia and Soviet Latvian press, critical of Latvian diaspora organizations (e.g. the American Latvian Association and others). In 1963, he published his memoirs Pārdomas ('Reflections') and in 1964  an essay on the Assembly of Captive European Nations, titled Savu tautu ienaidnieki ('Enemies of Their Peoples'). The same year he was appointed a member of the KGB-controlled Latvian Committee for Cultural Relations with Compatriots Abroad. The official purpose of these committees, founded in several Soviet republics in the 1960s, was the development of cultural contacts an promoting peace, but the secret purpose was investigation of the emigrant communities and using them in order to destabilize the democratic Western states.

Vilhelms Munters died on 11 January 1967 in Riga and was buried in the Forest Cemetery on 15 January.

Awards and decorations 
  Order of Lāčplēsis (1924, No. 1814)
  Order of the Three Stars, 2nd (14 May 1937), 3rd and 4th Class
  Cross of Recognition, 1st Class (16 November 1938, No. 2)
  Aizsargi Cross of Merit
  Medal of the Latvian Defense Society
  Order of the Polar Star, 1st (1937), 2nd and 3rd Class
  Order of the White Rose, 1st and 2nd Class
  Order of the Lithuanian Grand Duke Gediminas, 1st and 2nd Class
  Order of Vytautas the Great, 1st Class
  Order of Leopold, 1st and 2nd Class
  Order of the Crown, 3rd Class
  Cross of Liberty, 1st Grade 1st and 2nd Class
  Order of the Cross of the Eagle, 1st and 2nd Class
  Order of the Crown of Italy, 1st and 2nd Class
  Order of Saints Maurice and Lazarus, 1st Class
  Order of St. Sava, 2nd Class
  Military Order of Christ, 2nd Class
  Order of the Oak Crown, 3rd Class
  Order of Polonia Restituta, 1st and 3rd Class
  Legion of Honour, 2nd, 3rd and 5th Class
  Decoration of Honour for Services to the Republic of Austria, 1st Class
  Order of St. Gregory the Great, 1st Class
  Order of Brilliant Star, 1st Class
  Order of the Crown, 2nd Class
  Order of the German Eagle, 1st Class
  Order of the Dannebrog, 1st and 2nd Class

References

Literature
 Munters, Vilhelms, Historia.lv (in Latvian)
  (in Latvian)
 Vilhelma Muntera ēra Latvijā, Tekla Šaitere, Arhīvs / Diena (in Latvian)

Recipients of the Legion of Honour
Burials at Forest Cemetery, Riga
Recipients of the Order of Lāčplēsis
Latvian diplomats
Ministers of Foreign Affairs of Latvia
University of Latvia alumni
1967 deaths
1898 births
Recipients of the Cross of Recognition
People from Riga
Recipients of the Order of the Three Stars
Recipients of the Cross of Liberty (Estonia)
Recipients of the Order of the Crown (Italy)
Recipients of the Order of St. Sava
Recipients of the Order of Christ (Portugal)
Recipients of the Order of Polonia Restituta
Recipients of the Decoration of Merit for Services to the Republic of Austria
Recipients of the Order of Brilliant Star
Recipients of the Order of Vytautas the Great
Recipients of the Order of the Crown (Romania)
Recipients of the Order of the Crown (Belgium)
Recipients of the Order of Saints Maurice and Lazarus
Latvian people of Baltic German descent
Latvian people of Estonian descent
Latvian politicians